David Frederick Cock (22 October 1914 – 26 September 1992) was an English cricketer.  Cock was a right-handed batsman who occasionally fielded as a wicket-keeper.  He was born at Great Dunmow, Essex.

Cock made his first-class debut for Essex against Kent in the 1939 County Championship.  He made eleven first-class appearances in that season. He scored 326 runs in this season, which came at an average of 23.28, which included two half centuries. His first half century came against Sussex when he made 79 not out. His second half century saw him narrowly miss out on a century when he made 98 against Somerset at Chalkwell Park. World War II ended first-class cricket in England for the duration of that conflict.  Cock served during the war in the Royal Air Force, holding the rank of Acting Pilot Officer in February 1941. However, on 27 May 1942 he resigned his commission. Following the war he resumed his career with Essex, playing in three first-class matches in the 1946 County Championship, with his final appearance coming against Surrey. He played no further matches for Essex after this season.  In total, Cock played fourteen matches for Essex, scoring 355 runs at an average of 19.72.

In 1951, he played a single Minor Counties Championship match for Cambridgeshire against Lincolnshire. He died on 26 September 1992 at Uttlesford, Essex.

References

External links
David Cock at ESPNcricinfo
David Cock at CricketArchive

1914 births
1992 deaths
People from Great Dunmow
English cricketers
Essex cricketers
Cambridgeshire cricketers
Royal Air Force personnel of World War II
Royal Air Force officers